Margaret Steuart Pollard, née Gladstone (1 March 1904 – 13 November 1996), was a scholar of Sanskrit, a poet and bard of the Cornish language. She was the founding member of Ferguson's Gang, a secret society of supporters of the National Trust, who had their headquarters at Shalford Mill. She was the great great-niece of Liberal prime minister William Gladstone.

From 1920, she attended Newnham College, Cambridge, where she was the first woman to gain first-class honours in Oriental Languages. She married Captain Frank Pollard, an expert on Cornish history, and they lived in Truro, Cornwall. By 1938, she had become a bard, and a member of the Cornish Gorsedd. She published Bewnans Alysaryn, a Cornish-language miracle play, in 1941. She was an enthusiastic supporter of campaigns to defend the landscape, language and traditions of Cornwall and rural England. On one occasion she donated £100 to the National Trust as part of Ferguson's Gang, wearing a full mask to preserve her anonymity.

In 1947, a book about her home county, entitled Cornwall, that she had written was published by Paul Elek. She has been described as "humorous, perceptive, and intelligent". In 1951 she converted to Roman Catholicism, and in 1973 built a Roman Catholic church dedicated to Our Lady of the Portal and St Piran on the site of a medieval chapel in Truro. For this she received the Benemerenti Medal from the Pope.

She remained an active poet and translator throughout her long life. She remained a romantic figure, dressed as she was in a long skirt and a scarf wrapped around her head. She died at the age of 93 on 13 November 1996 at Truro.

References

Further reading

1904 births
1996 deaths
British Sanskrit scholars
Bards of Gorsedh Kernow
Alumni of Newnham College, Cambridge
20th-century English poets
20th-century British women writers
Poets from Cornwall
Recipients of the Benemerenti medal
National Trust people
Cornish-language writers
English Catholic poets